Edwin Carewe (March 3, 1883 – January 22, 1940) was an American motion picture director, actor, producer, and screenwriter. His birth name was Jay John Fox; he was born in Gainesville, Texas.

Career

After brief studies at the Universities of Texas and Missouri and a period of work with regional theatrical groups, Carewe moved to New York City in 1910, where he became a member of the Dearborn Stock Company. Although Jay Fox was his given name, Carewe chose Edwin (from stage actor Edwin Booth) and Carewe from a character he was playing.

Carewe was on stage as an actor before he worked for Lubin studios. Later, he directed films for MGM, First National, Universal Studios, Paramount Pictures, and United Artists. During his career, he provided early screen exposure to many actors such as Dolores del Río, Warner Baxter, Francis X. Bushman and Gary Cooper. He directed 58 films including the acclaimed 1928 version of Ramona starring Dolores del Río and Warner Baxter, which was rediscovered and restored by the Library of Congress and had its world premiere at the University of California, Los Angeles in 2014.

Carewe and his two brothers, Wallace Fox (a director/producer) and Finis Fox (a scenario writer), were all registered Chickasaw according to the 1907 Chickasaw Rolls.

Another of Carewe's notable films was Evangeline in 1929, also with Del Río, and written by his brother Finis Fox. Evangeline was based upon the poem by Henry Wadsworth Longfellow and earned praise for its exceptional lighting and camera work.

Although Carewe directed and produced a number of critically and financially successful pictures during the silent era, he was not fully able to make the transition to sound. After resorting to sound remakes of his earlier successes, and later to low-budget and religious films, he made his last feature Are We Civilized? in 1934.

Carewe was married three times, twice to actress Mary Akin. By his first wife, Mary Jane Croft (married January 9, 1909 in Toronto, Ontario), he had two daughters, Violette (who became an actress, known as "Rita Carewe") and Mary Jane. By his first marriage to his second wife, Mary Akin, he had two children, Sally Ann and William (born Edwin Gilbert). By his second marriage to Akin, they had one more child, Carol Lee.

Death
Carewe died from a heart ailment in his Hollywood apartment, and is buried at Hollywood Forever Cemetery.

Filmography

Director

Across the Pacific (1914)
 Cora (1915)
The Cowboy and the Lady (1915)
 Destiny (1915) 
The Final Judgment (1915)
The House of Tears (1915)
Marse Covington (1915)
The Dawn of Love (1916)
God's Half Acre (1916)
Her Great Price (1916)
The Snowbird (1916)
The Sunbeam (1916)
The Upstart (1916)
 The Barricade (1917)
The Greatest Power (1917)
Her Fighting Chance (1917)
The Trail of the Shadow (1917)
Their Compact (1917)
The Voice of Conscience (1917)
The House of Gold (1918)
Liberty Bond Jimmy (1918)
Pals First (1918)
The Splendid Sinner (1918)
The Trail to Yesterday (1918)
Easy to Make Money (1919)
False Evidence (1919)
The Right to Lie (1919)
 Shadows of Suspicion (1919)
The Way of the Strong (1919)
Isobel or The Trail's End (1920)
 Rio Grande (1920)
 The Web of Deceit (1920)
Habit (1921)
Her Mad Bargain (1921)
The Invisible Fear (1921)
My Lady's Latchkey (1921)
Playthings of Destiny (1921)
I Am the Law (1922)
A Question of Honor (1922)
Silver Wings (1922)
The Bad Man (1923)
The Girl of the Golden West (1923)
Mighty Lak' a Rose (1923)
Madonna of the Streets (1924)
A Son of the Sahara (1924)
Joanna (1925)
The Lady Who Lied (1925)
My Son (1925)
Why Women Love (1925)
High Steppers (1926)
Pals First (1926)
Resurrection (1927)
Ramona (1928)
Revenge (1928)
Evangeline (1929)
The Spoilers (1930)
Resurrection (1931)
Are We Civilized? (1934)

Actor

The Water Rats (1912)
Gentleman Joe (1912)
The Moonshiner's Daughter (1912)
A Girl's Bravery (1912)
The Call of the Heart (1913)
His Conscience (1913)
Into the Light (1913)
On Her Wedding Day (1913)
Her Husband's Picture (1913)
From Ignorance to Light (1913)
The Wine of Madness (1913)
The Great Pearl (1913)
Kidnapping Father (1913)
Retribution (1913)
A Mock Marriage (1913)
In the Harem of Haschem (1913)
A Florida Romance (1913)
Women of the Desert (1913)
The Moonshiner's Wife (1913)
Dolores' Decision (1913)
The Soul of a Rose (1913)
The First Prize (1913)
The Supreme Sacrifice (1913)
The Regeneration of Nancy (1913)
Down on the Rio Grande (1913)
It Might Have Been (1913)
Love's Justice (1913)
The Mexican Spy (1913)
The Miser (1913)
On the Threshold (1913)
Private Smith (1913)
The Three of Us (1914)
 Cora (1915)
Snowbird (1916)

Producer

Isobel or The Trail's End (1920)
The Web of Deceit (1920)
I Am the Law (1922)
The Bad Man (1923)
The Girl of the Golden West (1923)
Mighty Lak' a Rose (1923)
Madonna of the Streets (1924)
A Son of the Sahara (1924)
Joanna (1925)
Why Women Love (1925)
The Lady Who Lied (1925)
My Son (1925)
Pals First (1926)
High Steppers (1926)
Resurrection (1927)
Revenge (1928)
Evangeline (1929)
The Spoilers (1930)
Resurrection (1931)
Are We Civilized? (1934)

Writer
Across the Pacific (1914)
The Dancer and the King (1914)
Rio Grande (1920)
Resurrection (1927)

References

External links

Edwin Carewe at Virtual History
Official website of Edwin Carewe

1883 births
1940 deaths
20th-century American male actors
20th-century American male writers
20th-century Native Americans
American male film actors
American film directors
American film producers
American male screenwriters
American male silent film actors
Burials at Hollywood Forever Cemetery
Chickasaw people
Native American filmmakers
Native American male actors
20th-century American screenwriters